Parthenius of Nicaea or Myrlea in Bithynia was a Greek grammarian and poet. According to the Suda, he was the son of Heraclides and Eudora, or according to Hermippus of Berytus, his mother's name was Tetha. He was taken prisoner by Helvius Cinna in the Mithridatic Wars and carried to Rome in 72 BC. He subsequently visited Neapolis, where he taught Greek to Virgil, according to Macrobius. Parthenius is said to have lived until the accession of Tiberius in 14 AD.

Parthenius was a writer of elegies, especially dirges, and of short epic poems.

He is sometimes called "the last of the Alexandrians".

Erotica Pathemata
His only surviving work, the Erotica Pathemata (Of the Sorrows of Love), was set out, the poet says in his preface, "in the shortest possible form" and dedicated to the poet Cornelius Gallus, as "a storehouse from which to draw material". Erotica Pathemata is a collection of thirty-six epitomes of love-stories, all of which have tragic or sentimental endings, taken from histories and historicised fictions as well as poetry.

As Parthenius generally quotes his authorities, these stories are valuable as affording information on the Alexandrian poets and grammarians.

Contents
The mythical or legendary characters whose stories are presented in Erotica Pathemata are as follows.

 Lyrcus
 Polymela
 Evippe
 Oenone
 Leucippus, son of Xanthius
 Pallene
 Hipparinus of Heraclea
 Herippe
 Polycrite
 Leucone, wife of Cyanippus
 Byblis
 Calchus
 Harpalyce
 Antheus, loved and killed by Cleoboea
 Daphne
 Laodice
 Cratea, mother of Periander
 Neaera
 Pancrato, daughter of Iphimedeia
 Aëro, daughter of Oenopion
 Pisidice of Methymna
 Nanis
 Chilonis
 Hipparinus of Syracuse
 Phayllus
 Apriate (see Trambelus)
 Alcinoe
 Clite
 Daphnis
 Celtine
 Dimoetes
 Anthippe (see Epirus)
 Assaon
 Corythus
 Eulimene
 Arganthone

Other works
In Parthenius' own time, he was not famous for his prose but his poems. These are listed below:

Arete
Dirge on Archelais
Aphrodite
Bias
Delos
Krinagoras
Leucadiai
Anthippe
Dirge on Auxithemis
Idolophanes
Herakles
Iphiklos
Metamorphoses
Propemptikon
A Greek original of Moretum

The surviving manuscript
Parthenius is one of the few ancient writers whose work survives in only one manuscript. The only surviving manuscript of Parthenius was called Palatinus Heidelbergensis graecus 398 (P), probably written in the mid-9th century AD. It contains a diverse mixture of geography, excerpts from Hesychius of Alexandria, paradoxography, epistolography and mythology.

Editions of Parthenius
1531: Editio princeps, edited by Janus Cornarius. Basle, Froben.
1675: Historiae poeticae scriptores antiqui, edited by Thomas Gale, Paris.
1798: Legrand and Heyne, Göttingen.
1824: Corpus scriptorum eroticorum Graecorum, Passow, Leipzig.
1843: Analecta alexandrina, Augustus Meineke (ed.), Berolini sumptibus Th. chr. Fr. Enslini.
1843: Mythographoi. Scriptores poetiace historiae graeci, Antonius Westermann (ed.), Brunsvigae sumptum fecit Georgius Westermann, pagg. 152-81.
1856: Didot edition, Erotici scriptores, Hirschig, Paris.
1858: Hercher, Erotici Scriptores Graeci, Leipzig.
1896: Mythographi graeci, Paulus Sakolowski (ed.), vol. II, fasc. I, Lipsiae in aedibus B. G. Teubneri.
1902: Mythographi graeci, Edgar Martini (ed.), vol. II, fasc. I suppl., Lipsiae in aedibus B. G. Teubneri.
1916: S. Gaselee, Longus: Daphnis and Chloe and the love romances of Parthenius and other fragments, with English translation.
2000: J.L. Lightfoot, Parthenius of Nicaea: the poetical fragments and the Erōtika pathēmata. . Reviewed by Christopher Francese at The Bryn Mawr Classical Review
 2008: Michèle Biraud, Dominique Voisin, and Arnaud Zucker (trans. and comm.), Parthénios de Nicée. Passions d'amour. Grenoble: Éditions Jérôme Millon. Reviewed by Simone Viarre at The Bryn Mawr Classical Review

See also
Lyrcus

Notes

References

 Online text: Parthenius, Love Romances, translated by S. Gaselee, 1916.
 J. L. Lightfoot, Parthenius of Nicaea: the poetical fragments and the Erōtika pathēmata, p. 304.
 The Suda. Parthenius.

External links

 Erōtika pathēmata (original text in Greek)

1st-century BC births
14 deaths
Ancient Greek grammarians
Ancient Greek mythographers
Ancient Greek slaves and freedmen
Ancient Greek epic poets
Ancient Greek elegiac poets
1st-century BC poets
1st-century BC writers
People from Bithynia